The 1913 The Citadel Bulldogs football team represented The Citadel in the 1913 Southern Intercollegiate Athletic Association football season. This was the ninth year of intercollegiate football at The Citadel, with George C. Rogers serving as coach for the first season. All home games are believed to have been played at College Park Stadium in Hampton Park.

Schedule

References

Citadel
The Citadel Bulldogs football seasons
Citadel Bulldogs football